William Peachey (1826 – 2 March 1912) was a British architect known for his work for the North Eastern Railway.

History
He was born in 1826, baptised at St Mary's Church, Cheltenham on 13 September. His parents were  William Peachey, carpenter, and Emma.

On 8 September 1849, he married Harriet Moss in Salem Baptist Chapel in Cheltenham and in 1854 the couple moved to Darlington. He found employment with the Stockton and Darlington Railway. This was merged with the North Eastern Railway in 1863.

He was appointed ARIBA on 16 December 1867, and FRIBA on 2 May 1870. He was the Architect to the Darlington section of the North Eastern Railway until 1877.

He died on 2 March 1912.

Works
Saltburn Water Tower, [now]Upleatham St on Lune Street Corner 1860 [- demolished 1905] - Pease Bricks - bricks used to face a terrace of 8 houses onsite and adjacent land - called Water Tower Terrace which became Upleatham St.
Saltburn railway station 1861-62
Zetland Mews, Saltburn 1861
Zetland Hotel, Saltburn 1863
Wesleyan Schools, North Road, Darlington 1863
Wesleyan Chapel, Emerald Street, Saltburn 1864-65
Forcett Pasonage
Double Villa, Pierremont Crescent, Darlington 1866
Etherley railway station, 1866
Baptist Chapel, Priory Street, York 1867-68
Baptist Chapel, Grange Road, Darlington 1870-71
Tow Law railway station 1870-71
Brotton railway station 1875
North Road railway station Darlington 1876
Middlesbrough railway station 1874-77
York railway station 1877
Pinchinthorpe railway station 1877
Boosbeck railway station 1878
Sunderland station 1879 (replaced 1965)
Methodist Chapel, Victoria Bar, York 1880
Harrogate Baptist Church, Victoria Avenue, Harrogate 1883
Post Office, Regent Circus, (Windsor Road/Station Street) Saltburn 1901

References

19th-century English architects
British railway architects
North Eastern Railway (UK) people
Fellows of the Royal Institute of British Architects
1826 births
1912 deaths
People from Cheltenham
Architects from Gloucestershire
Associates of the Royal Institute of British Architects